A smash and grab is a particular form of burglary or looting that involves smashing a barrier, usually a display window in a shop or a showcase, grabbing valuables, and then making a quick getaway, without concern for setting off alarms or creating noise.   Typically, display windows and showcases that are in enclosed areas, such as shopping malls and office buildings, are less vulnerable to smash and grab raids than those on open streets – particularly where the streets are poorly lit or unobserved (such as premises in pedestrian subways or unstaffed transport facilities).  Recent smash and grab crimes have also involved ramming a pickup truck through the walls of a convenience store or gas station in order to remove the ATM from the premises and recover the cash.  Smash and grab raids can occur in many scenarios, both in broad daylight and at night, and the perpetrators can range from experienced thieves to impulsive vandals.

The greatest cost of smash and grab raids can often be in replacing the windows or walls, which can sometimes far exceed the cost of the goods that are stolen.

Deterrence
There are several approaches to deterring smash and grab raiders.  Shopkeepers can securely tether their goods, and make the tethering obvious to the onlooker.  They can also avoid displaying goods of value in windows, an approach that has the disadvantage of reducing the attractiveness of the display to customers.  Additionally, shopkeepers can strengthen window glass, to the extent that it can withstand, without breaking, being hit by the implements that smash and grab raiders are likely to use, such as hammers, bricks, and scaffolding poles.

Smash and grab raids became common in the 1930s, and were particularly prevalent in the 1940s, but decreased in frequency as shopkeepers took to strengthening their windows and/or fitting protective grilles.  By the 1950s, forced entry to shops was being effected by using cars and grappling irons to pull window bars off windows, a precursor to the 1980s phenomenon of ram-raiding.

References 

Crime